"No U Hang Up" is a song written by Arnthor Birgisson, Rami Yacoub and Savan Kotecha and performed by The X Factor winner, Shayne Ward. The song was released as a double A-side single along with "If That's OK with You", peaking at number two on the UK Singles Chart and reaching the top 20 in Denmark and Ireland. The song was described as invoking the image of "KFC wrappers blowing around in the doorway of JJB Sports".

Chart performance
Although the single was released as double A-side, the official Irish chart company, IRMA, did not combine the two singles when they charted, due to two different digital singles being available separately. "If That's OK with You" charted at number one, while "No U Hang Up" entered at number fourteen, later climbing to number eleven. In the UK, the single entered the chart at number two, being beaten to the top by the Sugababes song, "About You Now".

Weekly charts

Year-end charts

Certifications

References

2007 singles
2007 songs
Number-one singles in Scotland
Shayne Ward songs
Song recordings produced by Rami Yacoub
Songs written by Arnthor Birgisson
Songs written by Rami Yacoub
Songs written by Savan Kotecha
Sony BMG singles